Thomas R. Bennett (1830 – August 13, 1901) was a magistrate and political figure in Newfoundland. He represented Fortune Bay in the Newfoundland and Labrador House of Assembly from 1865 to 1874.

He was born in Windsor, Nova Scotia, and, in 1853, moved to Fortune Bay where he established a fishing supply business. Bennett was Speaker of the House of Assembly from 1869 to 1873. He served as a magistrate at Harbour Grace from 1874 to 1898. Bennett died in Harbour Grace in 1901.

References 
 

Speakers of the Newfoundland and Labrador House of Assembly
1830 births
1901 deaths
Newfoundland Colony judges